This Christmas, Aretha is the first Christmas album and thirty-sixth studio album by American singer Aretha Franklin. Produced by Franklin and Tena Clark, it was originally released on October 14, 2008, as a Borders Bookstore exclusive, consisting of eleven cover versions of Christmas standards and carols. In 2009, the album was reissued in 2009 on DMI Records. This Christmas debuted and peaked at number 102 on the US Billboard 200.

Critical reception

Allmusic editor Andy Kellman wrote:

Track listing
Credits taken from the album's liner notes.

Personnel
Credits adapted from the album's liner notes.

Vocalists

Aretha Franklin – vocals (2-3, 8-9, 11, lead on 1, 4-7, 10)
Tawatha Agee – background vocals (4)
Bridgette Bryant – Fire choir member (1, 5-6, 10)
Alvin Chea – Fire choir member (1, 5-6, 10)
Lynne Fiddmont – Fire choir member (1, 5-6, 10)
The Fire Choir – background vocals (1, 5-6, 10)
Lisa Fischer – background vocals (7)
Edward Franklin – vocals (2)
Wendy Fraser – Fire choir member (1, 5-6, 10)
Dorian Holley – Fire choir member (1, 5-6, 10)
Clydene Jackson – Fire choir member (1, 5-6, 10)
Shelly Ponder – background vocals (4)
Susie Stevens-Logan – Fire choir member (1, 5-6, 10)
Vanesse Thomas – background vocals (7)
Fonzi Thornton – background vocals (4, 7)
Carmen Twillie – Fire choir member (1, 5-6, 10)
Oren Waters – Fire choir member (1, 5-6, 10)
Gerald White – Fire choir member (1, 5-6, 10)
Brenda White-King – background vocals (4, 7)
Terry Wood – Fire choir member (1, 5-6, 10)

Instrumentalists

Aretha Franklin – acoustic piano (5, 8)
Luis Conte – percussion (2-3, 7)
Charles "Volley" Craig – bass played by (4, 8-9)
Matt Dahlgren – guitar (4, 9)
Nathan East – bass played by (1-3, 6, 7, 10)
Brandon Fields – saxophone (7)
Richard Gibbs – piano (4, 9)
Timothy Heinz – keyboards (1, 6, 10)
Darryl Houston – organ played by (4, 9)
Paul Jackson Jr. – guitar (1-2, 6-7, 10)
Ricky Lawson – drums (1-3, 6-7, 10)
Arthur Marbury – drums (4, 8-9)
Teddy Richards-White – guitar (4)
Michito Sanchez – percussion (7)
Onita Sanders – harp (8)
James "Big Jim" Wright – keyboards (2-3, 7)

Technical

Aretha Franklin – producer (4, 8-9)
H. B. Barnum – conductor (4, 8-9)
Tena Clark – producer (1-3, 5-7, 10-11)
Les Cooper – recording engineer (1-3, 5-7, 10-11)
Todd Fairall – recording engineer (4, 8-9)
Steve Genewick – Pro-tools editing
Don Goodrick – assistant recording engineer 
George Gumbs – assistant recording engineer 
Timothy Heinz – rhythm arrangements (1, 6, 10)
Bill Meyers – orchestral arrangement, orchestra conductor
Michael J. Powell – recording engineer (4, 8-9)
Tony Rizzo – assistant recording engineer 
Al Schmitt – audio mixing, strings recording engineer
Carmen Twillie – choir arrangements, choir conductor (1, 5-6, 10)
Ed Woolley – assistant recording engineer 
James "Big Jim" Wright – rhythm arrangements (2-3, 7)

Charts

References

Aretha Franklin albums
2008 Christmas albums
Christmas albums by American artists
Contemporary R&B Christmas albums